Assfort is a Japanese hardcore punk band from Tokyo.  Their musical style is fast and loud with angry, fast, undecipherable vocals.

Their style follows in the vein of old school 1980's japanese hardcore punk music, such as The Stalin and Gauze.

Members
Yoshio - vocals
Hiya - guitar
Shimomura - bass
Kiku - drums / No Think, CHARM, Conquest For Death, Sow Threat, R.A.G.S on Bass

Discography
 Five Knuckle Shuffle (album)  (1991)
 The Unlimited Variety of Noises  (1992)
 Ejacolation  (1995)
 Bark Up The Wrong Tree  (1996)
 P.K.O.  (1996)

External links
 Official Assfort Site (English & Japanese)

Japanese punk rock groups
Musical groups from Tokyo